Skenella umbilicata is a species of minute sea snail, a marine gastropod mollusk in the family Cingulopsidae.

Distribution

Description 
The maximum recorded shell length is 1.66 mm.

Habitat 
Minimum recorded depth is 4 m. Maximum recorded depth is 10 m.

References

 Ponder, W. F. (1983) Rissoaform gastropods from the Antarctic and sub-Antarctic: the Eatoniellidae, Rissoidae, Barleeidae, Cingulopsidae, Orbitestellidae and Rissoellidae (Mollusca: Gastropoda) of Signy Island, South Orkney Islands, with a review of the Antarctic and sub-Antarctic (excluding southern South America and the New Zealand sub-Antarctic islands) species. British Antarctic Survey, Scientific Reports 108: 1–96

External links
 Southern Ocean Mollusc Database (SOMBASE): Skenella umbilicata

Cingulopsidae
Gastropods described in 1983